Gabriel Thomas Woodward (born July 6, 1979) is an American former competition swimmer and Olympic medalist.

On February 21, 2017, The Master's University announced that Gabe would be joining them to launch their first-ever swimming and diving program for the Fall 2017 season. He plans to make the Master's U program a member of the Pacific West Conference, a conference comprising NCAA Division I, II, III and NAIA institutions in the southwestern United States.

Gabe is a 2001 Graduate of the University of Southern California where he earned a Bachelor of Arts Degree in Social Sciences. While at USC, he earned NCAA All-American honors three times. During his years as a collegiate student-athlete, Gabe was a medalist at the 1999 World University Games in the 4x100 free relay, and later he would serve as the 2001 Team Co-Captain for the Trojans Swim Team.

One of the brightest moments of Woodward's competitive career came in 2004 at the Olympic Games in Athens, Greece as a member of the U.S. 4x100 Free Relay team that earned a Bronze Medal. Years later, he served as the U.S. Team Co-Captain at the 2007 Pan Am Games where he was a silver medalist in the 4x100 Free Relay and a bronze medalist in the 100 Freestyle.

At the 2008 Olympic Trials, Woodward was a Finalist in the 100 Freestyle and a Semifinalist in the 50 Freestyle. In 2010, Gabe competed in the same two events at the US Championships.

Woodward is a native of Bakersfield, California and is a and is the owner of the Bakersfield Swim Academy and Bakersfield Swim Club. Gabe is married and has four children.

See also
 List of Olympic medalists in swimming (men)
 List of University of Southern California people
 The Master's University Athletics

References

 Coaches – Mustang Aquatics (Men)
 Coaches – Mustang Aquatics (Women)

External links
 
 
 
 
 
 
  Gabe Woodward – Athlete profile at USCTrojans.com

1979 births
Living people
American male freestyle swimmers
Medalists at the 2004 Summer Olympics
Olympic bronze medalists for the United States in swimming
Sportspeople from Bakersfield, California
Swimmers at the 2004 Summer Olympics
Pan American Games silver medalists for the United States
Pan American Games bronze medalists for the United States
Pan American Games medalists in swimming
Swimmers at the 2007 Pan American Games
Universiade medalists in swimming
Universiade bronze medalists for the United States
Medalists at the 2007 Pan American Games